Jacinta Atuto is a Ugandan politician who serves as a member of parliament for Kapelebyong District in the eleventh parliament of Uganda. She is the deputy chairperson for the parliamentary Committee On Climate Change. She is a member of the National Resistance Movement.

Other works 
She donated an ambulance to the people of Kapelebyong.

Controversies 
Ms Adupo Florence a former Kapelebyong Woman member of parliament for Kapelebyong District candidate on the Forum for Democratic Change who lost to Atuto, claimed that her votes in the 2021 elections were handed to her rivals who included Atuto, a matter Adupo took to the Soroti Chief Magistrates Court wanting the votes to be re-counted but her vote recount applications were dismissed by Chief Magistrate Monica Amono as they lacked substantial evidence to warrant a vote recount.

See also 

 List of members of the eleventh Parliament of Uganda
 Sauda Kauma
 Parliament of Uganda
 National Resistance Movement

References 

Living people
National Resistance Movement politicians
Members of the Parliament of Uganda
Women members of the Parliament of Uganda
21st-century Ugandan politicians
21st-century Ugandan women politicians
Year of birth missing (living people)